Gregory Jackson (August 2, 1952 – May 1, 2012) was an American basketball player. He won a collegiate national championship at Guilford College and later played in the National Basketball Association (NBA).

Jackson, a 6'0" point guard from Samuel J. Tilden High School in Brooklyn, New York.  He attended West Columbus High School 1969-1970, Cerro Gordo, NC.  He helped lead West Columbus to its first and only NCHSAA 2A State Basketball Tournament championship. He played his college basketball at Guilford College in Greensboro, North Carolina.  There he teamed in the backcourt with future NBA All-Star Lloyd Free (now World B. Free) to lead the Quakers to the 1973 National Association of Intercollegiate Athletics national championship.

After his college career was over, Jackson was drafted in the fifth round of the 1974 NBA draft (86th pick overall) by his hometown New York Knicks.  His tenure with the Knicks would prove to be brief, as he played only 5 games before being waived on October 28, 1974.  Later in the season, he was signed by the Phoenix Suns, where he finished the season.  For the year he averaged 3.7 points and 2.0 assists over 49 games.  In the offseason, Jackson was traded to the Washington Bullets, but never played in the NBA again.  During his playing career, Jackson also played for the Allentown Jets of the Eastern League.

Following the close of his professional career, Jackson became a community leader in Brooklyn as the long-time manager of the Brownsville Recreational Center.  In this capacity he ran numerous programs aimed at keeping inner-city youths off the streets and focused toward positive efforts ranging from sports to the arts.

Jackson died on May 1, 2012.

References

1951 births
2012 deaths
Allentown Jets players
American men's basketball players
Basketball players from New York City
Guilford Quakers men's basketball players
Lehigh Valley Jets players
New York Knicks draft picks
New York Knicks players
Phoenix Suns players
Point guards
Samuel J. Tilden High School alumni
Sportspeople from Brooklyn